Until 1999, Tanzania, Kenya and Uganda shared a telephone numbering plan, in which subscribers were only required to dial the trunk code, area code and number. In that year, this was discontinued following Tanzania's adoption of a new numbering plan, although calls between the three countries only required regional prefixes rather than international dialling. To call Uganda from Tanzania and Kenya, subscribers dial 006 instead of +256.

List of area codes in Uganda

References

Uganda
Telecommunications in Uganda